Oh No is the second album by Canadian musician Jessy Lanza. It was released on May 13, 2016 by Hyperdub. The album features co-production from Junior Boys' Jeremy Greenspan and was preceded by the singles "It Means I Love You" and "VV Violence".

Critical reception

The track "It Means I Love You" was named Best Song of 2016 by Gorilla vs. Bear.

Accolades

Track listing

Charts

References

2016 albums
Jessy Lanza albums
Hyperdub albums